Lideta Nyala is a professional football club from based in Addis Abeba, Ethiopia. They play at the Nyala Stadium, a venue in Addis Ababa that has a capacity of 3,000.

History 
They were relegated from the Ethiopian Premier League after the conclusion of the 2010-11 season.

References

Football clubs in Ethiopia